Freaking may refer to:
 Freaking or grinding, a type of partner dance where two or more individuals gyrate their bodies against each other

See also
 Freak, a person with strikingly unusual appearance or behaviour
 Freak (disambiguation)
 Freak out (disambiguation)
 Phreaking, manipulating telephone systems
 Seth "Freakin" Rollins, ring name of WWE Superstar Colby Lopez